Beth-El Synagogue (Portuguese: Sinagoga Beth-El) is a synagogue in the city of São Paulo, Brazil. Built in 1929, the synagogue has the distinction of being the first synagogue building in São Paulo. Consecrated in December 1929, construction of the temple was financed by a number of Jewish families in São Paulo and organized by Salomão Klabin. The synagogue's architecture is notable as the building has seven sides. Today, the synagogue hosts religious services while the building houses the Jewish Museum of São Paulo, which is dedicated to promoting local Jewish culture and history. While the building was consecrated in 1929, religious services were first held in the building in 1932.

Today, Beth-El Synagogue affiliates with an inclusive and pluralist form of Judaism and welcome people from different backgrounds.  The foundation of the synagogue in 1926 represents the communities historical roots in the community.

History 
The synagogue building, inspired by byzantine architecture, was designed by Russian architect  Samuel Roder at the request of local Jewish immigrant families. The synagogue was located in the neighborhood of Bom Retiro, where most of the community lived at the time. The building has seven sides, meant to symbolize both the seven days of creation and the branches of the menorah of the ancient Temple. The synagogue plays an important symbolic role in different life cycle events for the Jewish community of São Paulo, including britot milah, bar and bat mitzvah and weddings. In the 1960s, Beth El was also a local partner with the Israelite Federation of São Paulo State, in order to receive immigrants and provide job training.

It is said that plastic artist Gerson Knispel, briefly used the basement of Beth El as his studio.

Jewish Museum of São Paulo 
In May 2011, work began to convert the synagogue space into the Jewish Museum of São Paulo. This museum became the first museum of religion in the State of São Paulo, and had the main goal of preserving local Jewish history. The vision is to disseminate the relationship between the Jewish community and Brazil, including the difficulties faced by the community during the government of Getúlio Vargas.

An urn will be installed in the garden which will contain approximately one thousand different items, including items from World War II and victims of The Holocaust. While property values in downtown São Paulo have decreased, the museum project is estimated to invest 26 million Brazilian real into the community.

The museum collection is composed mostly of items with a symbolic, rather than financial value. This includes cutlery engraved with swastikas, war diaries and banknotes from the Concentration camps. While the new location was planned to open in 2013, work was ongoing as of 2019, due to the difficulty around adding new pillars in an area where an underground river had been rerouted.

Location 
Beth-El Synagogue is located on Rua Avanhandava, número 105 - 1º in the Bela Vista district of São Paulo. Since September 2013, the building has been listed by the Municipal Heritage Preservation Council due to its historical, religious and architectural value to the community.

Present day 
Currently, the synagogue is only open during the High Holidays (Rosh Hashana and Yom Kippur) or for scheduled visits. There are plans to move the Jewish Museum of São Paulo to the site of the synagogue. An organization around this project, the Friends of the Jewish Museum of São Paulo Association was founded in April 2000. As of 2017, a large amount of work had already been moved over to the synagogue building for the museum. in 2009, architecture firm Botti Rubin was hired to make the necessary adaptations of the building for the best  museological use of the space.

Rabbi Uri Lam became Rabbi for Beth-El in 2019, after years of experience with other liberal Jewish congregations. Born in São Paulo, Lam began as a liturgical and choir singer before moving into the rabbinate, serving as the leader of the Jewish community in Campinas, in the late 1990s.

In addition to Rabbi Lam, the synagogue is run by Iehuda Gitelman, with Marcio Bezen and Fortuna providing vocals under the direction of maestro Daniel Szafran.

Humanitarian work 
In May 2016, the synagogue held an event with local NGO Migraflix, Talal al-Tinawi and other Syrian refugees with the aim of increasing social inclusion among refugees in the community. A performance by the band Mazeej, formed by Muslims, Jews and Christians, was one of the highlights of the evening, and a lawyer was on-site to help refugees with their processing documents.

Education 
The synagogue offers a number of educational programs, including Hebrew classes, Bar and Bat Mitzvah preparation, meditation, marriage classes, and introduction to Judaism classes.

See also 

 Congregação Israelita Paulista
 Sinagoga Kahal Zur Israel
 List of synagogues
 History of the Jews in Latin America and the Caribbean
 History of the Jews in Brazil

References

Bibliography

External links 

 Official website
 Migraflix project

Religious buildings and structures in São Paulo
Synagogues in Brazil
Buildings and structures completed in 1929
1926 establishments in Brazil